Eymir may refer to:

Iran
Eymir, Iran (disambiguation)

Turkey
Eymir, Çorum
Eymir, Nallıhan, Ankara Province
Eymir, Elmalı, Antalya Province
Eymir, Merzifon, Amasya Province
Eymir, Gercüş, Batman Province
Lake Eymir, in Ankara Province